This is a list of all the songs sung and performed by English-Irish pop girl-group the Saturdays.

The list consists of all songs which have been released on the group's albums: Chasing Lights (2008), Wordshaker (2009), Headlines! (2010), On Your Radar (2011) and Living for the Weekend (2013). The list also includes the B-sides, which the band have released with their singles. To-date there have been eighteen singles and nineteen B-side singles. Cover versions of songs which the band have done and live covers which the band have performed at various places (e.g. on their tour) have also been listed. The band have so far sold over 6 million records in the United Kingdom alone.

Original songs

Covers

Live songs
 "Shut Up and Drive", Rihanna / "I Kissed a Girl", Katy Perry / "So What", Pink – The Work Tour & V Festival, 2009
 "Love the Way You Lie" / "What's My Name?" / "Only Girl (In the World), Rihanna – Headlines Tour, 2010
 "Just the Way You Are", Bruno Mars – Live Lounge, 2010
 "Winter Wonderland" – Live Lounge and the All Fired Up! tour, 2010
 "Baby", Justin Bieber – The Saturdays: 24/7, 2010
 "Moves like Jagger", Maroon 5 – All Fired Up! tour, 2011
 "Call Me Maybe", Carly Rae Jepsen – Summer Festivals 2012
 "Hold On, We're Going Home", Drake / "No Scrubs", TLC / "Survivor", Destiny's Child – Live Lounge, 2013

See also
 The Saturdays discography
 Polydor Records
 Fascination Records

Notes

A ^ This song also features Flo Rida.
B ^ This song also features Travie McCoy.
C ^ This song also features Sean Paul.

References

External links
Official website
 
 

Saturdays
Saturdays